The 1968 Delaware gubernatorial election was held on November 5, 1968. Republican nominee Russell W. Peterson defeated incumbent Democratic Governor Charles L. Terry Jr. with 50.51% of the vote.

General election

Nominations
Nominations were made by party conventions.

Candidates
Russell W. Peterson, Republican, civic activist
Charles L. Terry Jr., Democratic, incumbent Governor

Results

References

Bibliography
 
 
 

1968
Delaware
Gubernatorial
November 1968 events in the United States